Al Asimah means "the capital" in Arabic. It may refer to:
Al Asimah Governorate (Jordan), also known as Capital Governorate, or Amman Governorate
Al Asimah Governorate (Kuwait), also known as Capital Governorate, or Al Kuwayt Governorate
Al Asimah Governorate (Bahrain), also known as Capital Governorate, or Al Manamah Governorate